Collings is an Olde English surname with two possible origins. One is from the Norse name which in Olde English became 'Cola', meaning swarthy or dark. The second possibility is that it comes from 'Coll', a diminutive of Nicholas, meaning 'victory of the people'.

Alternative spellings or related surnames include Collin, Colling, Coling, Collins, Colings, Collis, Coliss, Collen, and Collens. For further information, see Collins.

Notable people with this surname include 

Benjamin Collings (born 1977), American politician
David Collings (1940–2020), British actor
Francis Collings, presenter of the "Sports News" television segment broadcast on BBC 1, BBC News 24 and BBC World since 1997
Jesse Collings (1831–1920), mayor of Birmingham, England, a member of Parliament, and an advocate of educational reform and land reform
Joe Collings (1865–1955), Australian politician
Keturah Anne Collings (1862-1948), British painter and photographer
Marie Collings (1791–1853), Dame of Sark from 1852 to 1853
Matthew Collings (born 1955),  British art critic and broadcaster
Michael R. Collings (born 1947), poet and speculative fiction literature critic, and former 
Rex Collings (1925-1996), first publisher of Watership Down
Samuel Collings, British artist of 18th century
Samuel Collings (actor), British actor
William Frederick Collings (1852–1927), Seigneur of Sark from 1882 to 1927
William Thomas Collings (1824–1882), Seigneur of Sark from 1853 to 1882
John Stanhope Collings-Wells (1880–1918), English recipient of the Victoria Cross

Fictional characters
Harry Collings, a character in the 1971 film The Hired Hand played by Peter Fonda

References

Surnames
Surnames of British Isles origin
Surnames of English origin
English-language surnames